A910 can mean:

 Motorola A910, a mobile phone
 A910 CB, a main belt asteroid
 A910 FA, a main belt asteroid
 A910 road (Great Britain)
 A910 series, a walkman made by Sony